Earl Joseph Roche (February 22, 1910 – August 15, 1965) was a Canadian ice hockey left winger. He played 147 games over five seasons in the National Hockey League (NHL) for the Montreal Maroons, Boston Bruins, Ottawa Senators, St. Louis Eagles and Detroit Red Wings. His brother Desse Roche also played in the NHL. The brothers often played on the same line; Earl at left wing and Desse on right wing.

Playing career
Roche was born in Prescott, Ontario, but moved to Montreal where he played junior hockey for the Montreal Victorias and other teams. He moved up to senior hockey for the Montreal Hockey Club and played for their Allan Cup-winning squad of 1930. He signed with the Maroons of the NHL, playing for the Maroons and the Windsor Bulldogs until 1933. He was released by the Maroons and signed with the Bruins in January 1933 only to be traded to the Senators one month later. In his one full season with the Senators in 1933–34 he showed a scoring touch, scoring 13 goals and 16 assists in 45 games. The next season, the Senators relocated to St. Louis to become the Eagles. Roche was traded twice in 1934–35; from St. Louis to Buffalo, then to the Red Wings. That marked his last season in the NHL, as he subsequently played for various minor-league pro teams until 1942.

Career statistics

Regular season and playoffs

References

External links
 

1910 births
1965 deaths
Boston Bruins players
Buffalo Bisons (IHL) players
Cleveland Barons (1937–1973) players
Cleveland Falcons players
Detroit Olympics (IHL) players
Detroit Red Wings players
Hershey Bears players
Ice hockey people from Ontario
Ice hockey people from Montreal
Montreal Maroons players
New Haven Eagles players
Ottawa Senators (1917) players
Ottawa Senators (original) players
People from Leeds and Grenville United Counties
Pittsburgh Shamrocks players
Providence Reds players
St. Louis Eagles players
Windsor Bulldogs (1929–1936) players
Canadian ice hockey left wingers